Paulose Mor Irenious is a Syriac Orthodox bishop, currently Metropolitan of Kozhikode Diocese and Patriarchal Vicar of Muscat.

His parish was St. Antony's Cathedral Church in Jeppu, Mangalore under Evangelical Association of the East.

Education
Paulose Mor Irenious got his bachelor's degree from the Karnataka University and master's degree in Sociology from Mysore University. Later he studied Diploma in Theology from Manjinikkara Dayro & M.S.O.T. Seminary, Mulanthuruthy. After his Diploma he further studied at Kolkata and  has B.D. followed by M.Th. Degree from Serampore University.

References

Living people
Syriac Orthodox Church bishops
Indian Oriental Orthodox Christians
Christian clergy from Mangalore
1972 births